Marjorie Hyams (August 9, 1920 – June 14, 2012) was an American jazz vibraphonist, pianist, and arranger.  She began her career as a vibraphonist in the 1940s, playing with Woody Herman (from 1944 to 1945), the Hip Chicks (1945), Mary Lou Williams (1946), Charlie Ventura (1946), George Shearing (from 1949 to 1950), and led her own groups, including a trio, which stayed together from 1945 to 1948, performing on 52nd Street in Manhattan.  The media, marquees, and promos often spelled her first name "Margie", but she insisted that it was spelled with a "j".

Career 

Hyams had her own trio and quartet (1940–1944) and played with Woody Herman (1944–1945) and Flip Phillips in the mid-1940s. She formed another trio with guitarists such as Tal Farlow, Mundell Lowe, and Billy Bauer from 1945 to 1948. She also arranged and sang with Charlie Ventura, and recorded with Mary Lou Williams. Hyams joined George Shearing from 1949 to 1950.

Woody Herman
Jack Siefert (born 1918), a lifelong friend of Woody Herman, introduced Hyams to Herman, who had already broken convention by hiring a female instrumentalist in 1941, Billie Rogers (born 1919).  Rogers played trumpet with Herman until 1943.  Hyams is one of Woody's exceptional alumni vibraphonists that included Terry Gibbs, Red Norvo, and Milt Jackson, all of whom, according to jazz author Doug Ramsey, were part of a Who's Who quality of an imaginary line-up that was staggering.

George Shearing
Hyams was a founder member of Shearing's world-famous quintet (1949-50) which achieved huge popularity and introduced an entirely new and much imitated ensemble sound in small group modern jazz. Shearing in his autobiography called Hyams 'a very fine musician... a thoroughly schooled classical pianist, well-versed in fugues and so on, but she'd taken up vibes in the early 1940s... We liked one another and got on very well. She also wrote some originals for the Quintet including November Seascape... [but she] left after about a year and a half... I think she just got tired of working for someone else and traveling so much, even though she was drawing a good salary.'

Family 
On June 6, 1950, Marjie Hyams married William G. Ericsson (1927–1978) in Chicago, and, from 1951 to 1970, played, taught, and arranged in Chicago.
Marjie and Bill had three children:  Lisa, Kristin (deceased) and Tod.  Marjie's husband Bill had the distinction of becoming the youngest CEO of a major bank at the age of 42.  

Her brother, Mark Hyams (1914–2007), was a jazz pianist who played with big bands, including those of Will Hudson (mid-1930s) and Spud Murphy (late 1930s).  Mark married L'Ana Webster ( Alleman; 1912–1997), a saxophonist and bandleader who was once married to jazz guitarist Jimmie Webster (1908–1978).

Selected discography

References

General references

  The Complete Jazz At the Philharmonic On Verve, 1944–49, 10 CDs, Verve Records (1998) 
  Scott Yanow, [ Marjorie Hyams] at Allmusic
  The Complete Encyclopedia of Popular Music and Jazz, 1900-1950, Three volumes, by Roger D. Kinkle (1916–2000), "Hyams" in Vol 2, Arlington House Publishers, New Rochelle, NY (1974)   
 The Encyclopedia of Popular Music, Third edition, Eight volumes, edited by Colin Larkin, "Hyams in Vol 4, Muze, London (1998) Grove's Dictionaries, New York (1998)   
 The New Grove Dictionary of Jazz, First edition, Two volumes, edited by Barry Dean Kernfeld (born 1950), Macmillan Press, London (1988)  
 The New Grove Dictionary of Jazz, edited by Barry Dean Kernfeld (born 1950), St. Martin's Press, New York (1994)   
 The New Grove Dictionary of Jazz, Second edition, Three volumes, edited by Barry Dean Kernfeld (born 1950), Macmillan Publishers, London (2002)   
 William D. Clancy, with Audree Coke Kenton, foreword by Steve Allen, Woody Herman: Chronicles of the Herds, Schirmer Books (1995)

Inline citations

1920 births
2012 deaths
20th-century vibraphonists
American jazz vibraphonists
Bebop musicians
American women jazz musicians
20th-century American women musicians
21st-century American women
Jazz vibraphonists